Muftbar is a 1981 Punjabi- and Saraiki-language comedy, action and musical film of Pakistan, directed by Hassan Askari and produced by Tariq Masood Qureshi. The film stars actor Sultan Rahi, Anjuman, Ali Ejaz and Afzaal Ahmed, and was edited by Mohammad Ashiq Ali Hujra Shah Muqeem.

Cast 

 Sultan Rahi as Shera
 Anjuman as Biloo
 Ali Ejaz as Javed
 Huma Dar as Suggi
 Najma Mehboob as Javed's mother
 Afzaal Ahmed as Jangi Palwan
 Firdous Jamal as Yousuf
 Mujahid Abbas as Munshi
 Hamid Rana as Surli
 Majid Janghir as Ustad
 Abo Shah
 Kokab Dar
 Nasheela
 Ali Hassan
 Javed Razvi
 Fakhri Ahmed

Soundtrack
The music of Muftbar is composed by Kemal Ahmed with lyrics penned by Khawaja Pervez. The album earned

Track listing

References

External links

 
 

Pakistani action comedy-drama films
Pakistani comedy-drama films
Pakistani fantasy films
Punjabi-language Pakistani films
Nigar Award winners
1980s action comedy-drama films
1980s fantasy comedy-drama films
1980s Punjabi-language films
1981 comedy films
1981 films
1981 drama films